Anthony Pratt may refer to:

 Anthony Pratt (businessman) (born 1960), Australian billionaire, executive chairman of Pratt Industries and board member of Visy Industries
 Anthony D. G. Pratt (born 1937), British art director
 Anthony E. Pratt (1903–1994), English musician and inventor of the board game Cluedo/Clue